Mirha-Soleil Ross is a transgender videographer, performance artist, sex worker and activist. Her work since the early 1990s in Montreal and Toronto has focused on transsexual rights, access to resources, advocacy for sex workers and animal rights.

Early life 
Ross grew up in a poor neighbourhood of Montreal, Quebec. As a teenager during the 1980s, she became aware of animal abuse. At that time, Ross became a vegetarian and involved with animal rights activism. She said that although people often ask her what it was like to try to pass as a woman, she struggled much more when she was trying to pass as a boy and was often attacked for looking too feminine. Ross moved from Montreal to Toronto during the early 1990s, where she was a sex worker and began producing zines and videos.

gendertrash from hell 
From 1993 to 1995 Ross and partner Xanthra Phillippa MacKay published gendertrash from hell, a quarterly zine which "[gave] a voice to gender queers, who've been discouraged from speaking out & communicating with each other". They managed the zine's publisher, genderpress, which also distributed other transsexual pamphlets and literature, corresponded with local organizations and sold buttons.

In standard zine format, gendertrash was a combination of art, poetry, resource lists, serialized fiction, calls to action, classified ads, illustrations and collages and movie reviews. By and for transsexual, transgender and transvestite people, it addressed gender experiences at the individual and societal level and prioritized sex workers, low-income queers, trans people of colour and prisoners. Articles frequently addressed the erasure of transsexuals from lesbian, gay, bi and queer communities and the communities' co-opting of trans identities and issues. Five issues of gendertrash were published, and its run ended in 1995.

Videos 
Ross' videos, primarily short films, centre on gender, sexuality, animal rights and the humour and beauty of the transsexual body. Her videos are distributed by V tape in Toronto.

Videography

Performance art 
Ross produced a one-woman show, Yapping Out Loud: Contagious Thoughts from an Unrepentant Whore, based on her sex work and activism, at the 2002 Mayworks Festival of Working People and the Arts and in 2004 at the Buddies in Bad Times Theatre. The show intended to educate audiences about issues facing sex workers and refute stereotypes contributing to violence against them. Yapping Out Loud also incorporated Ross' animal-rights activism with images of coyotes and comparisons between oppression faced by sex workers and coyotes, inspired by the American sex-worker organization Call Off Your Old Tired Ethics. In 2001 and 2002 she performed a nine-month Pregnancy Project, appearing in public with a prosthetic belly to have conversations about gender, motherhood and the possibility of womb transplants for transsexuals.

Counting Past 2 
In 1997, 1998, and 1999 Ross ran Counting Past 2 (CP2), a transsexual and transgender film, video, performance and spoken-word festival which provided a space for transsexual and transgender people to speak for themselves without catering to the aesthetic standards or curiosity of cisgender audiences. The festival's goal was to be more inclusive and encouraging of trans artists than mainstream gay and lesbian film festivals by centring trans voices, accepting less-polished work and including cabaret and performance components instead of restricting submissions to films. Performers included Aiyyana Maracle and Max Wolf Valerio. In 2002, the festival returned after a two year hiatus, under the stewardship of Boyd Kodak and Cat Grant. In a 2007 interview with Viviane Namaste, Ross said that her efforts with CP2 to create transsexual spaces outside a lesbian and gay framework had failed and she regretted that those spaces had disappeared or been absorbed by the LGBT community.

Social service 
During the 1990s and early 2000s, Ross was involved in social-service work for the transsexual and sex-worker communities in Toronto. In 1999 she was the founding coordinator of Meal-Trans at the 519 Church Street Community Centre, a drop-in program offering meals and peer support to trans people. Ross was involved in the general expansion of the 519's trans programs, providing services for transsexuals who are HIV positive and sex workers and founding peer-support groups for trans men and trans women with colleague Rupert Raj.

Ross and her friends worked to improve access to social services for Toronto transsexuals, particularly those who were sex workers, HIV-positive, low-income or immigrants. She worked with women's shelters, community centres and sex-worker organizations such as Maggie's to improve access and educate service providers. As a sex worker, Ross was involved in pushing back against efforts by residents' organizations in the Gay Village and Allan Gardens areas to expel sex workers.

Awards 
Ross has received several grants from the Canada Council for the Arts. Her video, Mateřština (co-directed with Mark Karbusicky), won the Marian McMahon Award at the 2004 Images Festival in Toronto. In 2001, Ross was the Grand Marshal of Toronto's Pride Parade. In 2011, she was inducted into Canada's Q Hall of Fame.

Exhibition history

References

External links
 Mirha-Soleil Ross fonds - Archival records at The ArQuives: Canada's LGBTQ2+ Archives

1969 births
Artists from Montreal
Canadian multimedia artists
Canadian video artists
Women video artists
Canadian LGBT artists
Living people
Transgender artists